The Good Doctor is an American medical drama television series developed for ABC by David Shore, based on the South Korean series of the same name. The series is produced by Sony Pictures Television and ABC Studios, with Shore serving as showrunner. The series stars Freddie Highmore as Shaun Murphy, a young autistic surgical resident with savant syndrome, alongside Nicholas Gonzalez, Antonia Thomas, Chuku Modu, Beau Garrett, Hill Harper, Richard Schiff, and Tamlyn Tomita. Will Yun Lee, Fiona Gubelmann, Christina Chang, Paige Spara, Jasika Nicole, Bria Samoné Henderson, Noah Galvin, and Osvaldo Benavides joined the principal cast in later seasons. The series premiered on September 25, 2017.

In March 2022, the series was renewed for a sixth season, which premiered on October 3, 2022.

Series overview

Episodes

Season 1 (2017–18)

Season 2 (2018–2019)

Season 3 (2019–20)

Season 4 (2020–21)

Season 5 (2021–22)

Season 6 (2022–23)

Ratings

Season 1

Season 2

Season 3

Season 4

Season 5

Season 6

References

External links
 
 

Lists of American drama television series episodes